The 1986 Nobel Prize in Literature was awarded to the Nigerian writer Wole Soyinka (born 1934) "who in a wide cultural perspective and with poetic overtones fashions the drama of existence." He is the first African recipient of the prize.

Laureate

Wole Soyinka is most well known for his playwriting with The Lion and the Jewel (1959), A Dance of the Forests (1960), Kongi's Harvest (1964), and Death and the King's Horseman (1975) as among his best works. Along with his writing career, he has worked as an actor and in theaters in Nigeria and Great Britain. Poems, novels, and essays are also included in his body of work, among them The Interpreters (1965), Season of Anomy (1972), and Aké: The Years of Childhood (1981). Although Soyinka writes in English, the Yoruba culture of his home Nigeria and its myths, stories, and rituals are deeply ingrained in his writings. His writing also draws from Western traditions, from modernist play to classical tragedies.

Reactions
When Soyinka was awarded, he become the first African laureate. He was described as one "who in a wide cultural perspective and with poetic overtones fashions the drama of existence". Reed Way Dasenbrock writes that the award of the Nobel Prize in Literature to Soyinka is "likely to prove quite controversial and thoroughly deserved". He also notes that "it is the first Nobel Prize awarded to an African writer or to any writer from the 'new literatures' in English that have emerged in the former colonies of the British Empire."

Nobel lecture
His Nobel lecture, This Past Must Address Its Present, was devoted to the South African freedom-fighter Nelson Mandela. Soyinka's speech was an outspoken criticism of apartheid and the politics of racial segregation imposed on the majority by the National South African government.

References

External links
Award Ceremony speech nobelprize.org
1986 Press release nobelprize.org

1986